The San Gabriel Valley Tribune is a paid daily newspaper located in Monrovia, California, that serves the central and eastern San Gabriel Valley. It operated at the West Covina location from 1955 to 2015. The Tribune is a member of Southern California News Group (formerly the Los Angeles Newspaper Group), a division of Digital First Media. It is also part of the San Gabriel Valley Newspaper Group, along with the Pasadena Star-News and the Whittier Daily News.

The newspaper chain Brush-Moore purchased the Tribune in 1960.  Thomson Newspapers purchased Brush-Moore in 1967. Thomson sold the Tribune to Singleton's MediaNews Group in 1996.

History

The San Gabriel Valley Tribune was launched on March 21, 1955, in West Covina, California. Before the launching, readers had to read community weeklies. The newspaper was founded by Carl Miller, his brother A.Q. Miller and Corwin Hoffland.  After 60 years at the West Covina location, the newspaper moved its operations to Monrovia, with daily local news coverage which includes city government, public education, public safety, transportation issues, entertainment, lifestyle, and editorials. The newspaper has received a number of awards, including best in front page category from the California Newspaper Publishers Association among suburban area dailies. It publishes the annual So Cal Prep Legends high school football magazine with coverage from the San Fernando Valley, the San Gabriel/Pomona Valleys, the Whittier area, the South Bay, Long Beach/Gateway Cities, Orange County, western and central Riverside County and San Bernardino Valley, published in late August. The annual San Gabriel Valley's Best magazine, which publishes in late May, honors the best people, places to shop, eateries, and services in the region.

Coverage area
Coverage area for the San Gabriel Valley Tribune includes the cities of 
 Alhambra 
 Azusa 
 Baldwin Park 
 Covina 
 Diamond Bar
 Duarte 
 El Monte 
 Glendora
 Industry
 Irwindale
 La Puente
 Monrovia 
 Montebello
 Monterey Park 
 Rosemead 
 San Gabriel 
 South El Monte 
 Temple City  
 Walnut
 West Covina

References

External links

Daily newspapers published in Greater Los Angeles
San Gabriel Valley
Mass media in Los Angeles County, California
MediaNews Group publications
Monrovia, California
Digital First Media
Newspapers established in 1955
1955 establishments in California